The R410 road, also called the Blessington Road, is a regional road in Ireland, located in County Wicklow and County Kildare.

References

Regional roads in the Republic of Ireland
Roads in County Kildare
Roads in County Wicklow